Democratic National Conference is a splinter group of the Jammu & Kashmir National Conference. It was formed by Ghulam Muhammad Sadiq in 1957.

DNC later joined the Communist Party of India, then Communist Party of India (Marxist) and then Communist Party of India (Marxist-Leninist). The group was led by Ram Piara Saraf.

References

Defunct political parties in Jammu and Kashmir
Political schisms
1957 establishments in Jammu and Kashmir
Political parties established in 1957